Luring Lips is a 1921 American silent drama film directed by King Baggot and starring Edith Roberts, Ramsey Wallace and William Welsh.

Cast

 Edith Roberts as Adele Martin
 Darrell Foss as Dave Martin
 Ramsey Wallace as Frederick Vibart
 William Welsh as James Tierney
 Carlton S. King as Mark Fuller 
 Mortimer E. Stinson as Detective

References

Bibliography
 Munden, Kenneth White. The American Film Institute Catalog of Motion Pictures Produced in the United States, Part 1. University of California Press, 1997.

External links
 

1921 films
1921 drama films
1920s English-language films
American silent feature films
Silent American drama films
American black-and-white films
Films directed by King Baggot
Universal Pictures films
1920s American films